The Manab Nyaya Shastra is the first codified law of Nepal. It was written during the Malla Dynasty, which is known to be the 5th dynasty of Nepal. It was written by King Jayasthiti Malla in the 14th century along with the help of five learned persons; Kirtinath Upadhyaya Kanyakubja, Raghunath Jha Maithili, Srinath Bhatta, Mahinath Bhatta, and Ramanath Jha. The Manab Nyaya Shastra was consequently written after the study of Manu Smriti, Yagyawalkya Smriti, Mitachhyara Tika, Brihaspati Smriti, Narad Smriti and other holy texts. It was written concentrating on the practices that prevailed in the society then. The Manab Nyaya Shastra has introduced many legal provisions regarding houses, lands, castes, dead bodies etc. It was the major source of rendering justice during the medieval period. Much influence of religion can be found in the laws then.

References

Law of Nepal
History of Nepal
14th century in Nepal